Marti Sementelli (born November 17, 1992 in Boston) is a member of the United States women's national baseball team which won a gold medal at the 2015 Pan American Games.

Playing career
Sementelli played Little League Baseball in Sherman Oaks, California, earning All-Star honors. During high school, she spent two years on the baseball team at Burbank High and two playing for Matt Mowry at Birmingham High. While at Birmingham, she pitched a complete game against San Marcos High School of Santa Barbara, throwing 102 pitches. At 15 years of age, she competed with Team USA at the Women's World Cup of Baseball. Of note, she was the youngest player on the US roster.

In 2011, she earned a baseball scholarship to Montreat College in North Carolina, played for coach Michael Bender.

Awards and honors
 2008 World Cup All-Tournament Team (Best Righthanded Pitcher)

Personal
She was once interviewed by Jimmy Kimmel.

Bibliography

References

People from Boston
American female baseball players
1992 births
Living people
Baseball players at the 2015 Pan American Games
American people of Italian descent
Pan American Games gold medalists for the United States
Pan American Games medalists in baseball
Medalists at the 2015 Pan American Games